Diana Schröder (born 18 April 1975) is a retired German artistic gymnast. In 1992 she won national titles on the balance beam, parallel bars and all-around and was selected for the 1992 Summer Olympics, where she finished in ninth place with the German team. Her best individual result was 29th place all-around.

References

1975 births
Living people
German female artistic gymnasts
Gymnasts at the 1992 Summer Olympics
Olympic gymnasts of Germany
People from Mühlhausen
Sportspeople from Thuringia
20th-century German women
21st-century German women